Sakala is an Estonian language daily newspaper first published in Viljandi on 11 March 1878 by Carl Robert Jakobson, a major figure of the Estonian national awakening period in the 19th century.

Sakala was the first political newspaper in Estonian. It was the most popular newspaper among Estonians in the late 19th century. Today it is the local newspaper of Viljandi County.

The masthead logo of Sakala was designed by Eduard Magnus Jakobson.

References

External links
 

Newspapers published in Estonia
Estonian-language newspapers
Viljandi County
Publications established in 1878
1870s establishments in Estonia
Mass media in Viljandi